Hungary wields considerable influence in Central and Eastern Europe and is a middle power in international affairs. The foreign policy of Hungary is based on four basic commitments: to Atlantic co-operation, to European integration, to international development and to international law. The Hungarian economy is fairly open and relies strongly on international trade.

Hungary has been a member of the United Nations since December 1955 and holds current membership with the European Union, NATO, the OECD, the Visegrád Group, the WTO, the World Bank, the AIIB and the IMF. Hungary took on the presidency of the Council of the European Union for half a year in 2011 and the next will be in 2024. In 2015, Hungary was the fifth largest OECD Non-DAC donor of development aid in the world, which represents 0.13% of its Gross National Income. In this regard, Hungary stands before Spain, Israel or Russia.

Hungary's capital city, Budapest is home to more than 100 embassies and representative bodies as an international political actor. Hungary hosts the main and regional headquarters of many international organizations as well, including European Institute of Innovation and Technology, European Police College, United Nations High Commissioner for Refugees, Food and Agriculture Organization of the United Nations, International Centre for Democratic Transition, Institute of International Education, International Labour Organization, International Organization for Migration, International Red Cross, Regional Environmental Center for Central and Eastern Europe, Danube Commission and even others.

Since 1989, Hungary's top foreign policy goal was achieving integration into Western economic and security organizations. Hungary joined the Partnership for Peace program in 1994 and has actively supported the IFOR and SFOR missions in Bosnia. Hungary since 1989 has also improved its often frosty neighborly relations by signing basic treaties with Ukraine, Slovakia, and Romania. These renounce all outstanding territorial claims and lay the foundation for constructive relations. However, the issue of ethnic Hungarian minority rights in Romania, Slovakia and Ukraine periodically causes bilateral tensions to flare up. Hungary since 1989 has signed all of the OSCE documents, and served as the OSCE's Chairman-in-Office in 1997. Hungary's record of implementing CSCE Helsinki Final Act provisions, including those on the reunification of divided families, remains among the best in Central and Eastern Europe.

Except for the short-lived neutrality declared by the anti-Soviet leader Imre Nagy in November 1956, Hungary's foreign policy generally followed the Soviet lead from 1947 to 1989. During the Communist period, Hungary maintained treaties of friendship, cooperation, and mutual assistance with the Soviet Union, Poland, Czechoslovakia, the German Democratic Republic, Romania, and Bulgaria. It was one of the founding members of the Soviet-led Warsaw Pact and Comecon, and it was the first country to withdraw from those organizations. After 1989, Hungary oriented more towards the West, joined NATO in 1999 and the European Union in 2004.

Overview
As with any country, Hungarian security attitudes are shaped largely by history and geography. For Hungary, this is a history of more than 400 years of domination by great powers—the Ottomans, the Habsburg dynasty, the Germans during World War II, and the Soviets during the Cold War—and a geography of regional instability and separation from Hungarian minorities living in neighboring countries. Hungary's foreign policy priorities, largely consistent since 1990, represent a direct response to these factors. Since 1990, Hungary's top foreign policy goal has been achieving integration into Western economic and security organizations. Hungary joined the Partnership for Peace program in 1994 and has actively supported the IFOR and SFOR missions in Bosnia. The Horn government achieved Hungary's most important foreign policy successes of the post-communist era by securing invitations to join both NATO and the European Union in 1997. Hungary became a member of NATO in 1999, and a member of the EU in 2004.

Hungary also has improved its often frosty neighborly relations by signing basic treaties with Romania, Slovakia, and Ukraine. These renounce all outstanding territorial claims and lay the foundation for constructive relations. However, the issue of ethnic Hungarian minority rights in Slovakia and Romania periodically causes bilateral tensions to flare up. Hungary was a signatory to the Helsinki Final Act in 1975, has signed all of the CSCE/OSCE follow-on documents since 1989, and served as the OSCE's Chairman-in-Office in 1997. Hungary's record of implementing CSCE Helsinki Final Act provisions, including those on the reunification of divided families, remains among the best in eastern Europe. Hungary has been a member of the United Nations since December 1955.

The Gabčíkovo - Nagymaros Dams project
This involves Hungary and Czechoslovakia, and was agreed on September 16, 1977 ("Budapest Treaty"). The treaty envisioned a cross-border barrage system between the towns Gabčíkovo, Czechoslovakia and Nagymaros, Hungary. After an intensive campaign, the project became widely hated as a symbol of the old communist regime. In 1989 the Hungarian government decided to suspend it. In its sentence from September 1997, the International Court of Justice stated that both sides breached their obligation and that the 1977 Budapest Treaty is still valid. In 1998 the Slovak government turned to the International Court, demanding the Nagymaros part to be built. The international dispute is still not solved as of 2008.

On March 19, 2008 Hungary recognized Kosovo as an independent country.

Disputes – international:
Ongoing Gabčíkovo - Nagymaros Dams dispute with Slovakia

Illicit drugs:
Major trans-shipment point for Southwest Asian heroin and cannabis and transit point for South American cocaine destined for Western Europe; limited producer of precursor chemicals, particularly for amphetamines and methamphetamines

Refugee protection:
The hungarian border barrier was built in 2015, and Hungary was criticized by other European countries for using tear gas and water cannons on refugees of the Syrian Civil War as they were trying to pass the country.

Since 2017, Hungary–Ukraine relations have rapidly deteriorated over the issue of the Hungarian minority in Ukraine.

Hungary and Central Asia
A number of Hungarian anthropologists and linguists have long had an interest in the Turkic peoples, fueled by the eastern origin of the Hungarians' ancestors. The Hungarian ethnomusicologist Bence Szabolcsi explained this motivation as follows: "Hungarians are the outermost branch leaning this way from age-old tree of the great Asian musical culture rooted in the souls of a variety of peoples living from China through Central Asia to the Black Sea".

Diplomatic relations 
List of countries with which Hungary maintains diplomatic relations: Hungary maintains diplomatic relations with all UN member states excluding Bhutan and Vanuatu.

Relations by region and country

Africa

Americas

Asia

Europe

Oceania

Foreign criticism 
In December 2010, the Fidesz government adopted a press and media law which threatens fines on media that engage in "unbalanced coverage". The law aroused criticism in the European Union as possibly "a direct threat to democracy".

In 2013, the government adopted a new constitution that modified several aspects of the institutional and legal framework in Hungary. These changes have been criticized by the Council of Europe, the European Union and Human Rights Watch as possibly undermining the rule of law and human rights protection.

See also
 List of diplomatic missions in Hungary
 List of diplomatic missions of Hungary
 Visa requirements for Hungarian citizens

References

Further reading
 Borhi, László, “In the Power Arena: U.S.-Hungarian Relations, 1942–1989,” The Hungarian Quarterly (Budapest), 51 (Summer 2010), pp 67–81.
 Glant, Tibor, “Ninety Years of United States-Hungarian Relations,” Eger Journal of American Studies, 13 (2012), pp 163–83.
 Hornyak, Arpad. Hungarian-Yugoslav Diplomatic Relations, 1918–1927 (East European Monographs, distributed by Columbia University Press; 2013) 426 pages.
 Niklasson, Tomas. "Regime stability and foreign policy change: interaction between domestic and foreign policy in Hungary 1956-1994" (PhD dissertation Lund University, 2006) online.
 Váli, Ferenc A, "The Foreign Policy of Hungary" in Kuhlman, James A (ed.), The Foreign Policies of Eastern Europe: Domestic and International Determinants (Sijthoff, Leyden, 1978).